Goranovtsi is a village in Kyustendil Municipality, Kyustendil Province, south-western Bulgaria. It had a population of 82 people as of 2013.

References

Villages in Kyustendil Province